The external examiner plays an important role in all degree level examinations in higher education in the United Kingdom.  The external examiner system originated in 1832 with the establishment of the University of Durham, the first in England since Cambridge was founded 600 years earlier. Durham used Oxford examiners to assure the public that its degrees were a similar standard to Oxford's. The establishment of more universities in England from the 1880s was accompanied by a requirement that examinations be conducted by internal and external examiners.  It is also found in countries whose higher education systems were developed from United Kingdom practice, or strongly influenced by it, after its introduction, including  New Zealand, and India.  It is one of the oldest systems of quality control within higher education.

It is a requirement for all degree level examinations at British universities, and in countries operating a similar system, that at least one member of the examining board should be from a university other than the one awarding the degree (and should have no recent affiliation with it).  This applies both to undergraduate examinations, where there may be hundreds or even thousands of candidates, and to postgraduate examinations including those for the PhD where a special board is convened for each candidate.

Role
While the role of the external examiner varies with the level of examination, the purpose of the system remains the same: to ensure that standards are kept the same across universities, and to provide an assurance of fair play given that internal examiners might be prejudiced for or against a candidate.  In consequence, (by convention and often by regulation) if examiners disagree, the view of the external examiner takes precedence.

Undergraduate and Taught Postgraduate examinations
In undergraduate and taught postgraduate examinations, external examiners typically see and have to approve draft examination questions before the papers are set; and they will review the marks and the work of at least a sample of candidates. They are often asked to adjudicate when candidates are on borderlines or when internal examiners have disagreed about a candidate's marks. Externals are expected to make a report both to the department and also to the university authorities; they have wide licence to comment on all aspects of the degree programme, including its staffing and teaching, not just on the examination process. Where viva voce examinations are still held as part of the final degree assessment, it is common for external examiners to take part in them. Students may have the right to ask for their work to be considered by the external examiner. External examiners are typically appointed for a period of three or four years, and it is common to consult them about changes to the programme that are being introduced during their period of office. In the case of examinations in broad disciplines, there are commonly several external examiners with different areas of expertise on a board of examiners.

PhD examinations

In PhD examinations within the British system, there are normally only two or three examiners, and the external examiner usually takes the lead in questioning the candidate in the viva voce examination which is the key stage of the assessment.  In some other countries, e.g. Australia, New Zealand and India, externals commonly send their opinions by post, though there may also be a "local" external examiner who is present at the viva.

Appointees
Whatever the level of examination, it is normal to appoint as externals senior academics of acknowledged expertise – though in the case of PhD exams, expertise takes priority over seniority if the two criteria cannot both be met, as is often the case with highly specialised subjects. An invitation or appointment to serve as an external examiner is therefore usually seen as something of an honour, though often an inconvenient one: although a fee is paid to external examiners, it is usually small, and a considerable amount of work is involved, often at the busiest time of the academic year.

While the external examiner in the form described here (and the use of the title "External examiner") is specific to British or British-influenced higher education, the use of examiners from other universities (and often other countries) is widespread in other countries, especially for PhD examinations.

References

Higher education in the United Kingdom
Student assessment and evaluation